Ahmat Abderamane (born 1 January 1993) is a Chadian professional footballer who plays as a centre-back for Chad Premier League club Renaissance FC and the Chad national team.

International career 
Abderamane is a Chad international. He made his debut for the Chad national team in a 3–3 draw against Equatorial Guinea on 28 July 2019. His first goal came in a 1–1 draw against Guinea on 15 November 2020. On 29 March 2022, Abderamane scored in a 2–2 draw against the Gambia.

References 

1993 births
Living people
Chadian footballers
People from Logone Occidental Region
ASLAD de Moundou players
Renaissance FC players
AS CotonTchad players
Chad Premier League players
Chad international footballers